The 1976 World Junior Curling Championships were held from February 22 to 27 in Aviemore, Scotland. The tournament only consisted of a men's event.

Teams

Round robin

  Teams to playoffs

Playoffs

Final standings

Awards
 WJCC Sportsmanship Award:  Massimo Alvera

All-Star Team:
Skip:  Robert Kelly
Third:  Ken Horton
Second:  Sjur Loen
Lead:  Kelly Stearne

References

World Junior Curling Championships
World Junior Championships
World Junior Curling Championships
Sport in Highland (council area)
International curling competitions hosted by Scotland
World Junior Curling Championships
1976 in youth sport